Ali Iqtidar Shah Dara (April 1, 1915 – January 16, 1981) was an Indian and later Pakistani field hockey player and the longest-serving hockey manager who competed in the 1936 Summer Olympics and  the 1948 Summer Olympics.

In 1936, he was a member of the Indian field hockey team, which won the gold medal at the 1936 Summer Olympics. He played two matches as forward. "Dara played in the hockey team at Berlin in 1936 when an undivided India won the gold, defeating the home team Germany (8-1). Sitting in the VIP stand was Chancellor Adolf Hitler, leader of the Nazi party ruling Germany."

Dara was also a serving officer in the Indian Army. His army regiment was sent to Malaysia during the Second World War, where Dara was captured.

In 1947, British India was divided into India and Pakistan. Dara, who hailed from West Punjab province of undivided India, opted to live in Pakistan.

Twelve years later he participated in the 1948 tournament for Pakistan as the team captain. Dara was easily the best choice to construct and lead Pakistan's Hockey team to 1948 Summer Olympics.   He played all seven matches as forward. They faced Holland in the match for third place, which the two teams drew with a goal each. This match was replayed later, during which Pakistan was defeated 4-1, leaving them in 4th place.

Dara was the manager of the Pakistan Hockey Team at 1976 Montreal Olympic Games where Pakistan won the bronze medal.

References

External links

1915 births
1981 deaths
Field hockey players from Faisalabad
Pakistani male field hockey players
Olympic field hockey players of India
Olympic field hockey players of Pakistan
Field hockey players at the 1936 Summer Olympics
Field hockey players at the 1948 Summer Olympics
Indian male field hockey players
Olympic gold medalists for India
Olympic medalists in field hockey
Medalists at the 1936 Summer Olympics